Hoosier is an unincorporated community in Stockton Township, Greene County, Indiana.

The community took the name of a local mine.

Geography

References

Unincorporated communities in Greene County, Indiana
Unincorporated communities in Indiana
Bloomington metropolitan area, Indiana